Tohvri may refer to several places in Estonia:

Tohvri, Hiiu County, village in Emmaste Parish, Hiiu County
Tohvri, Viljandi County, village in Pärsti Parish, Viljandi County